Kinderstern/Star for Children is an artwork series the German artist Imi Knoebel has created since 1988. The artwork is entirely donated to projects for children in need. The Star for Children has so far collected donations of four million Euros and is the only artwork worldwide from which 100% of proceeds go to children in need. The "Star for Children in Need" receives support through artists and collectors, musicians and actors/actresses, museums like Deutsche Guggenheim in Berlin and Sammlung Grässlin in the Blackforest and art fairs.

History 

The Kinderstern is a social sculpture formulated in 1967 by Joseph Beuys.

In 1988, the Star for Children was printed for the first time as silkscreen in red. This print was, next to original prints from the artists Sol LeWitt, Jörg Immendorff,  Sigmar Polke, Max Bill, Heinz Mack, Keith Haring, part of a portfolio created under the auspices of Lothar Späth, minister-president of Baden-Württemberg/Germany. Title of the portfolio: "Kinderstern"/Star for Children. Its proceeds supported the financing of accommodations for parents close to pediatric clinics.

In 2016, Knoebel told collectors not to buy the Kinderstern at auctions, stating that the auction houses overpriced the art.

Exhibitions
 1991 Art Cologne
 1993 Art Frankfurt
 2010 Art Cologne
 2010 art forum berlin
 2011 Pure Freude Düsseldorf
 2012 Herberholz Frankfurt
 2014: Pure Freude Düsseldorf
 2015: Pure Freude Düsseldorf
 2016: Pure Freude Düsseldorf
 2016: Herberholz Frankfurt
 2017: Pure Freude Düsseldorf

Kinderstern Sponsorships and Cooperations

 Grace P. Kelly Foundation 
 Association for the Fight against Mucoviscidosis,
 Union Tschernobyl, Aid for Tschernobyl victims in the Ukraine
 Fanconi Anemia Project, Heinrich Heine University Düsseldorf.
 Aid for Bulgaria
 Christian Campaign Man and Environment for the Pediatric Clinic Nr. 14 Ochmatdet, Kiew 
 Medical child protection day ward at the Protestant Hospital in Düsseldorf
 Arco Iris Foundation for Street Kids in La Paz/Bolivia
 The children´s Right Foundation
 World in Union e. V. Düsseldorf
 Order of the Poor Brothers in Düsseldorf, accommodating homeless children.
 Children's Planet Heidelberg/Germany
 Phönikks, a Foundation for psycho social help, Hamburg/Germany
 Peacevillage Oberhausen/Germany, aid for children in war zones
 Children´s village Baan Gerda for HIV orphans in Nong Muang/ Thailand
 German Economic Foundation for Humanitarian Help/WHH
 From the Hearts to the Hearts – cardiac operations for child victims of Agent Orange in Vietnam
 SonKy Orphanage in Saigon/Vietnam financing the buying of a new house for orphans
 Outback Stiftung, Refugee Home Düsseldorf, language training and social aid for child refugees
 Ullaaitivu Children's Aid, Sri Lanka
 Support of Waaga e.V., medical aid for children from Afghanistan
 Caritas Mettmann, Projects for refugee children
 Königinnen und Helden, neighborhood Integration Projects in Düsseldorf
 Schlaufox, Hamburg, Initiative to support immigrant children Education
 Diakonie Kaiserswerth, language training and integrative Dance-Workshops
 Bunte Schule Dortmund, Waldorf education in social hotspot Dortmund
 IJS e.V, integrative projects for particularly vulnerable refugee children
 Carolinenhof Essen, therapeutic riding for children with special needs
 Support of a school in a social hotspot in Düsseldorf
 Wasserwerk Theater, Strausberg, integrative Theatre projects for children
 UPSALA, the street children's circus in St. Petersburg, 
 "Housing First" purchase of a flat for homeless mothers.

References and notes

External links
 kinderstern.com
 Imi Knoebels guter Stern Spiegel, Hamburg, 2. Juli 1990, S. 167.
 Himmlische Momente.  In: Monopol Magazin. Berlin, Oktober 2010
 "Artist Imi Knoebel: 'If you want to stay alive, you have to do something radical" The Guardian, 15. July 2015

Further reading
 Imi Knoebel: Werke von 1966 bis 2006. Kerber, Bielefeld 2007. Kinderstern page 24 ff., .
 Imi Knoebel: Zu Hilfe, zu Hilfe ... Hatje Cantz Verlag, Berlin 20 .

Kinderstern
Children's charities based in Germany
Organizations established in 1988